This is a list of members of the Council of the German Cultural Community between 1986 and 1990, following the direct elections of 1986.

Composition

Sources
 

List
1980s in Belgium
1990 in Belgium